Khosrowabad (also Romanized as Khosrowābād) is a city in Jajrud Rural District of Jajrud District of Pardis County, Tehran province, Iran. At the 2006 census, its population was 1,180 in 386 households, when it was a village in Siyahrud Rural District of the Central District of Tehran County. The following census in 2011 counted 799 people in 250 households. The latest census in 2016 showed a population of 1,083 people in 340 households, by which time the village was the largest in Jajrud Rural District of Jajrud District in the newly established Pardis County.

After the census, the Central District was established by separating the rural district and the city of Pardis from Bumahen District. The village of Khosrowabad was elevated to the status of a city.

References 

Pardis County

Cities in Tehran Province

Populated places in Tehran Province

Populated places in Pardis County